Sir John Jephson (died 1638) was an English soldier and MP for Hampshire and Petersfield.

John Jephson may also refer to:
John Jephson (priest), Irish Anglican priest
John Jephson (died 1693), Irish MP for Mallow
John Jephson (died 1724), Irish MP for Blessington